Saint Andrew West Rural is a parliamentary constituency represented in the House of Representatives of the Jamaican Parliament. It elects one Member of Parliament MP by the first past the post system of election.

Boundaries 

The constituency covers the areas of Brandon Hill and Chancery Hall.

References

Parliamentary constituencies of Jamaica